The Royal Oak is a pub in the city centre of York, in England.

The pub lies on Goodramgate.  The building is believed to date from the 15th-century and is largely timber-framed, although much of it has been rebuilt.  The north-eastern section is of three storeys and contains one original internal wall, while the south-western section was originally a single-storey hall and contains part of one original partition wall, plus a reset Mediaeval beam.

In the 18th-century, the north-eastern section was extended to the rear, in brick.  Many of the features of the upper floors date from this period, including the staircase.  A second storey was added to the south-western section in the 19th-century, while in 1934 the ground floor was refurbished, with a new frontage, in the Brewer's Tudor style.

The building was a pub by 1772, when it was known as the Blue Pigg.  It later became known as the Blue Boar, and has been the Royal Oak since 1819.  From 1894, it was owned by the local John J. Hunt Brewery, while in the mid-20th century, it was acquired by Camerons Brewery.

References

External links

Buildings and structures completed in the 1400s
Goodramgate
Grade II listed pubs in York